The 1987 Wightman Cup was the 59th edition of the annual women's team tennis competition between the United States and Great Britain. It was held at The College of William & Mary in Williamsburg, Virginia in the United States.

References

1987
1987 in tennis
1987 in women's tennis
1987 in American tennis
1987 in British sport 
1987 in sports in Virginia